The Min peoples or Mountain Ok peoples are a cultural group in the West Sepik Province of Papua New Guinea.

The Min peoples, though multiple distinct peoples, shared a ritual system. The Telefol were acknowledged by the Min as being at the highest level of sacred knowledge, and groups such as the Baktaman were at the lowest level. In this ranking the Urapmin were either at the top or at least very close to the Telefol.

References

Bibliography 
 
 

Indigenous peoples of Melanesia
Ethnic groups in Papua New Guinea
Min peoples